Hoa Nguyen (born 1967) is an American poet and academic.

Early life and education
Born in Vĩnh Long, Nguyen is the daughter of a Vietnamese mother; her biological father, an American man, abandoned the family before Nguyen was born. She was raised in the Washington, D.C. area. Nguyen earned a Bachelor of Science degree in psychology from the University of Maryland, College Park and a Master of Fine Arts degree from the New College of California in San Francisco.

Career 
With her husband Dale Smith, Nguyen edited ten issues of Skanky Possum Magazine, and under this imprint, published books and chapbooks by Kristin Prevallet, Tom Clark, Frank O'Hara, and others. Together they host a reading series presenting performances by Pierre Joris, Linh Dinh, Susan Briante, Joshua Marie Wilkinson, Kate Greenstreet, Laynie Browne, Anselm Berrigan, and others. Since 1998, she has led a popular virtual and in-person  writing workshop focusing on the works of poets such as Alice Notley, Eileen Myles, Joanne Kyger, Philip Whalen, Charles Olson, Emily Dickinson, and Gertrude Stein. She currently teaches poetics at Toronto Metropolitan University, Miami University, and the Milton Avery Graduate School of the Arts at Bard College.

Her poems have been published in numerous journals and anthologies, including Days I Moved Through Ordinary Sound: The Teachers of WritersCorps in Poetry and Prose (City Lights, 2009), The Best of Fence (Fence Books, 2009), For the Time Being: A Bootstrap Anthology (Bootstrap Books, 2008),  and in An Anthology of New (American) Poets, Black Dog, Black Night: Contemporary Vietnamese Poetry (Milkweed Editions, 2008) (Talisman House, 1998). She is the author of Dark (1998), Parrot Drum (Leroy, 2000), Your Ancient See Through (Sub Press, 2002) and Red Juice (Effing, 2005), Hecate Lochia (Hot Whiskey Press, 2009), as well as many online publications. Nguyen is frequently asked to give readings, act as poet in residence, and lecture on poetry for organizations across the country.

Her collection, As Long As Trees Last, was published by Wave Books in September, 2012. Her most recent collection, Violet Energy Ingots, was published by Wave Books in 2016 and was shortlisted for the Griffin Poetry Prize in 2017.

Nguyen was a judge for the 2020 Griffin Poetry Prize.

Personal life 
Nguyen lives in Toronto, Ontario.

Bibliography

Full-length collections
Your Ancient See Through (Subpress, 2002)
Hecate Lochia (Hot Whiskey Press, 2009)
As Long As Trees Last (Wave Books, 2012)
Red Juice: Poems 1998-2008 (Wave Books, 2014)
Violet Energy Ingots (Wave Books, 2016) (shortlisted for the 2017 Griffin Poetry Prize)
A Thousand Times You Lose Your Treasure (Wave Books, 2021) (shortlisted for the 2021 National Book Award for Poetry)

Chapbooks and booklets
Dark (Mike and Dale's Press, 1998)
Let's Eat Red for Fun (Booglit, 2000)
Parrot Drum (Leroy Press, 2000)
Add Some Blue (Backwoods Broadsides Chaplet Series, 2004)
Six Poems (Tolling Elves, 2005)
Red Juice (Effing Press, 2005)
Poems (Dos Press Chaps, 2007)
What Have You (Longhouse Poetry, 2008)
Kiss a Bomb Tattoo (Effing Press, 2009)
Chinaberry (Fact-Simile, 2010)
Late in the Month (Country Valley Press, 2011)
Tells of the Crackling (Ugly Duckling Presse, 2015)
Ask About Language As If It Forgets (knife fork book, 2019)

References

External links

Interview with Hoa Nguyen by The Poetry Extension

1967 births
Living people
Vietnamese emigrants to the United States
New College of California alumni
21st-century Vietnamese poets
American women poets
Vietnamese women poets
21st-century American poets
21st-century American women writers
21st-century Canadian women writers
21st-century Canadian poets
Canadian women poets
Writers from Toronto
21st-century Vietnamese women writers
University of Maryland, College Park alumni